The 1966 United States Senate election in Minnesota took place on November 8, 1966. Incumbent Democratic U.S. Senator Walter Mondale, who had originally been appointed in 1964 to replace Hubert Humphrey after Humphrey was elected Vice President of the United States, defeated Republican challenger Robert A. Forsythe, to win a full term.

Democratic–Farmer–Labor primary

Candidates

Declared
 Ralph E. Franklin
 Walter Mondale, Incumbent U.S. Senator since 1964

Results

Republican primary

Candidates

Declared
 Robert A. Forsythe, businessman
 Henry A. Johnsen

Results

General election

Results

See also 
 United States Senate elections, 1966

References

Minnesota
1966
1966 Minnesota elections
Walter Mondale